The men's cross-country competition of the cycling events at the 2019 Pan American Games was held on July 28 at the Morro Solar.

Schedule

Results

References

Cycling at the 2019 Pan American Games
Mountain biking at the Pan American Games